Escape from New York is a 1981 board game by TSR, Inc. and illustrated by Erol Otus and Bill Willingham and based on the John Carpenter film Escape from New York, which was released that same year.

Overview
The objective of each game player is the same as Snake Plissken's in the film. Players attempt to locate the President of the United States and get him off the prison island of Manhattan. Failing that, they are to find the cassette tape the President is carrying. Failing that, they die.

Reviews
Jeux & Stratégie #19

References

External links

The Escape from New York & L.A. Page

Adventure board games
American board games
Board games introduced in 1981
Licensed board games
Science fiction board games
TSR, Inc. games